Drūkšiai, also called Drysviaty or Drysvyaty, or Drisvyaty is the largest of the Braslau Lakes located partly in the northeastern part of Lithuania and partly in the Vitebsk Voblast, in Belarus. The lake water was used to cool the reactors of the Ignalina Nuclear Power Plant.

The greatest depth of the lake is 33.3 m, and the average depth is 7.6 m. The basin of the lake was formed during the movement of the glaciers by two perpendicular channels, which expanded north to south and west to east. The maximum depth of the first channel is 29 m, and the second one - 33.3 m. The greatest depths are located near the middle of the lake. The shallowest part is on the south ridge of the lake, its depth is approximately between 3 and 7 meters.

Six small rivers flow into the lake, and one dammed river flows out.

See also
Lakes of Lithuania
Prorva River

Footnotes

References
Druksiai ecological tourism center 
Site name: Lake Druksiai with adjacent territories. Ecological Institute at University of Vilnius.

Druksiai
Drisvjaty
Tourist attractions in Utena County
LDruksiai
Druksiai
Belarus–Lithuania border